James Mark Craigen (born 2 August 1938) is a Scottish Labour Co-operative politician.

Born in Glasgow, Craigen was educated at the Shawlands Academy, then at Strathclyde University and Heriot-Watt University. From 1954 to 1961 he worked as a compositor. He then spent time with the Scottish Gas Board, and from 1964 to 1968 was Head of Organisation and Social Services with the Scottish Trades Union Congress, then moved to the Scottish Business Education Council.

Craigen served on Glasgow City Council from 1965 to 1968. He stood unsuccessfully for Ayr in 1970. Subsequently he was Member of Parliament for Glasgow Maryhill from 1974 to 1987, when he stood down. His successor was Maria Fyfe. He was educated at Shawlands Academy, in Glasgow.

References

The Times Guide to the House of Commons, Times Newspapers Ltd, 1983

External links 
 

1938 births
Living people
Labour Co-operative MPs for Scottish constituencies
UK MPs 1974
UK MPs 1974–1979
UK MPs 1979–1983
UK MPs 1983–1987
People educated at Shawlands Academy
Members of the Parliament of the United Kingdom for Glasgow constituencies
Maryhill